This is a list of civil parishes in the ceremonial county of Gloucestershire, England. There are 312 civil parishes. The City of Bristol is a ceremonial county in its own right and is listed separately.
The former Cheltenham Municipal Borough, Gloucester County Borough and Kingswood Urban District are unparished. Parts of the former Mangotsfield Urban District are unparished. Population figures are unavailable for some of the smallest parishes.

See also
 List of civil parishes in England

References

External links
 Office for National Statistics : Geographical Area Listings

Civil parishes
Gloucestershire
 
Local government in Gloucestershire
Civil parishes